Emilia Töyrä is a Swedish politician currently sitting in the Riksdag with the Social Democrats.

References  

1985 births
Living people
21st-century Swedish women politicians
Women members of the Riksdag
Members of the Riksdag 2014–2018
Members of the Riksdag 2018–2022
People from Kiruna Municipality
Members of the Riksdag from the Social Democrats